Global Underground is a British record label and compilation series founded in 1996 by Andy Horsfield and James Todd. The label symbolised the international explosion of dance music during the 1990s, 2000s, and 2010s and first manifesto for high-end DJs such as Tony De Vit, Sasha, Paul Oakenfold, John Digweed, Danny Tenaglia, Nick Warren, Dave Seaman, Darren Emerson, James Lavelle, Carl Cox, and Solomun.

The name Global Underground originally refers to a series of electronic music compilation albums which reflect the performances of various DJs in venues around the world. The Global Underground series was released by a record label formerly known as Boxed which featured several sister series such as Nubreed and Electric Calm. Boxed closed in 2001 and was superseded by Global Underground Ltd. Since its first release in 1996, the series was well received and became a hallmark in the progressive house world. The dance music style featured is mostly progressive house, but there is some house, trance house, hard house, techno and breakbeat included in the releases. The first five installments were live recorded from respective clubs, while the rest are mixed and recorded in a studio.

Background
Each issue in the series is based on the idea that Global Underground would take DJs to play a party in one of the most unusual, exotic clubbing locations on Earth.  The set is then released in a 2CD format that is formatted to capture the night of the party and the overall feel of the DJ visit in music, contemporary photography by photographer Dean Belcher and extensive sleeve notes.

There are consistent characteristics in almost every album in the series including: 
Each album being mixed by a globe-trotting DJ.
The prominent influence of the location on the music and packaging.
Extensive sleeve notes describing local clubbing scene and/or venue often written by Mixmag Editor Dom Phillips.
Each album consisting of two discs.
The song list is edited from the complete set based on a retrospective view of the performance.
Photography by Dean Belcher

International recognition
Billboard has recognized Global Underground as the first DJ mix compilation to place high-quality photographs of DJs on the album covers. This, it further asserted, played a part in turning DJs into superstar figures within the culture of electronic dance music.

Thrive Records was the U.S. distributor for some of the early Global Underground releases. Global Underground albums had an alternate numbering sequence and had different artwork, but were otherwise the same.

Catalogue
This is the complete listing of available albums in the Global Underground main series which includes the sequential number of the album in the series, the performing DJ/producer, the location in which the performance took place and the official release date.  The listed catalog numbers are for the British releases.  The numbers on the albums distributed by Thrive in the United States are shown in parentheses - those without such labels do not have a differing release number. Global Underground also has several "sub-series" entitled Nubreed, Prototype, 24:7, Electric Calm, Afterhours, and most recently Global Underground DJ.

GU official 

GU Sampler series releases
 GUSAM001 The Forth, Departures, release date: 27 October 1998
 GUSAM002 The Forth, Arrivals, release date: 1999
 GUSAM003 The Forth, Destinations, release date: 29 January 2001
 GUSAM004 The Forth, Locations, release date: 2001
 GUSAMUS001 The Forth, Passport, release date: 2001
 GUSAM005 The Forth, Exposures, release date: 2004
 GUSAM006 The Forth, Synchronised, release date: October 2005
 GUSAM007 Dubfunk, Synchronised 2, release date: 6 November 2007

Anniversary compilations
 GUXCD GU10 10th anniversary compilation release date: 15 May 2006

GU DJ
 GUDJ001 Nic Fanciulli, release date: 27 April 2009
 GUDJ002 Plump DJs, release date: 12 October 2009
 GUDJ003 Wally Lopez, release date: 27 April 2009
 GUDJ004 Tom Novy, release date: 15 November 2010

Nubreed
Nubreed features mix albums from what Boxed considers "up-and-coming DJs", though it has featured experienced DJs such as Satoshi Tomiie.

NuBreed series releases
Nubreed 001 (2000) by Anthony Pappa
 Nubreed 002 (2000) by Danny Howells
 Nubreed 003 (2000) by Steve Lawler
 Nubreed 004 (2001) by Sander Kleinenberg
 Nubreed 005 (2001) by Lee Burridge
 Nubreed 006 (2002) by Satoshi Tomiie
 Nubreed 007 (2009) by Jim Rivers
 Nubreed 008 (2009) by Sultan
 Nubreed 009 (2016) by Habischman
 Nubreed 010 (2017) by Oliver Schories
 Nubreed 011 (2018) by Theo Kottis
 Nubreed 012 (2018) by Denney

Prototype
 PRO:001 Seb Fontaine, release date: 29 April 1999
 PRO:002 Seb Fontaine, release date: 2 November 1999
 PRO:003 Seb Fontaine, release date: 18 April 2000
 PRO:004 Seb Fontaine, release date: 29 May 2001

24:7
24:7 is a series where DJs are asked to put together a set of two notably contrasting halves, based on the conceptual opposites of 'day' and 'night'.

24:7 series releases
 GU247001 Danny Howells, release date: 21 July 2003
 GU247002 Lee Burridge, release date: 15 September 2003

Chill out compilations
Electric Calm is a series in the chill or "calm" side of electronica while Afterhours is similar to the Back to Mine series.  Both Afterhours and Electric Calm, along with GU "Sampler" CDs, were compiled and mixed by Global Underground themselves.

Electric Calm series releases

 GUEC001 The Forth, release date: 30 September 2002
 GUEC002 The Forth, release date: 25 August 2003
 GUEC003 The Forth, release date: 13 February 2006
 GUEC004 Dubfunk, release date: 1 October 2007
 GUEC005 Trafik, release date: 7 December 2009
 GUEC006 Trafik, release date: 21 August 2015
GUEC007 Trafik, release date: 19 May 2017

Afterhours series releases
 GUAF001 The Forth, release date: 11 November 2002
 GUAF002 Trafik, release date: 21 February 2005
 GUAF003 Trafik, release date: 29 January 2007
 GUAF004 Trafik, release date: 16 July 2007
 GUAF005 Unknown, release date: 30 March 2008
 GUAF006 Unknown, release date: 28 July 2008
GUAF007 Unknown, release date: 22 April 2016
GUAF008 Unknown, release date: 20 April 2018

Lights Out
In 2002, former NuBreed DJ Steve Lawler was given his own imprint on the Global Underground label that he titled "Lights Out". The concept of the series of mixed CDs was to bring the darker, grittier side of the dancefloor into the spotlight.

Lights Out series releases
 GULO001 Steve Lawler, release date: 24 June 2002
 GULO002 Steve Lawler, release date: 27 October 2003
 GULO003 Steve Lawler, release date: 3 October 2005

Fundacion
Fundacion series releases
 GUFUN001C Sasha - Fundacion NYC, release date: 13 June 2005

GU Music
In 2003, the Global Underground franchise began their "GU Music" imprint. Up until this time, they were strictly a label that dealt in DJ compiled and mixed CDs.  GU Music allowed Global Underground to get into full length artist albums and Vinyl/CD/MP3 single releases. The GU Music team commented: "Having nurtured some of the worlds finest DJs we have applied this expertise to original music, cherry picking the coolest future talent from across the globe..."  They have featured releases from such artists as UNKLE, Lostep, and Trafik.  In 2007, it expanded with the release of the compilation GU Mixed which started a series of the same name that consisted of music sought from GU Music.

GU Music album releases
 GUMU001 Pako & Frederik - Atlantic Breakers, release date: 20 October 2003
 GUMU002 Trafik - Bullet, release date: 4 October 2004
 GUMU003 Lostep - Because We Can, release date: 17 April 2006
 GUMU004 The Remote - Too Low to Miss, release date: 26 June 2006
 GUMU005 Sissy - All Under, release date: 2006
 GUMU006 Dark Globe - Nostalgia for the Future, release date: 2006
 GUMU007 Trafik - Club Trafikana, release date: 6 August 2007
 GUMU008 Roland Klinkenberg - Mexico Can Wait, release date: 20 August 2007
 GUMU009 Eelke Kleijn - Naturally Artificial, release date: 2 October 2007
 GUMU010 Pako & Frederik - The Alert, release date: 5 November 2007
 GUMU011 Rogue Audio - Haphazard, release date: 21 April 2008
 GUMU012 Alex Dolby - Psiko Garden, release date: 17 June 2008
 GUMU013 The Last Atlant - A Cloudburst of Colors, release date: 25 August 2008
 GUMU014 Anil Chawla & Dale Anderson - Roadhouse, release date: 23 February 2009
 GUMU015 Trafik - None But the Brave, release date: 21 June 2010

GU Mixed Releases
 GUMIX1CD CD1, CD2, CD3 In mixed and unmixed formats, release date: 21 May 2007
 GUMIX1CDX CD1, CD2, CD3, CD4 Limited Edition in mixed and unmixed formats, release date: 21 May 2007
 GUMIX2CD CD1, CD2, CD3 In mixed and unmixed formats, release date: 3 September 2007
 GUMIX2CDX CD1, CD2, CD3, CD4 Limited Edition in mixed and unmixed formats, release date: 3 September 2007
 GUMIX3CD CD1, CD2, CD3 In mixed and unmixed formats, release date: 16 June 2008
 GUMIX3CDX CD1, CD2, CD3, CD4 Limited Edition in mixed and unmixed formats, release date: 16 June 2008
 GUMIX4CD CD1, CD2, CD3 In mixed format, release date: 25 May 2009

GU002
In Boxed's UK releases, GU002 was the never released second installment in the Global Underground series (in Thrive's US re-numbered releases, Paul Oakenfold's New York mix was released as GU002).  Global Underground jumped directly from GU001: Tony De Vit - Live In Tel Aviv to GU003: Nick Warren - Prague, which resulted in a lot of controversy and rumours on the nature of GU002.  However, GU002 does exist in form of the tape pack of Tony De Vit's Tel Aviv CD as the actual catalogue number of the release is GU002T. When Boxed started the GU series in 1996, they did not have a clear vision about the numbering scheme (later to become part of their image), which resulted in the "missing" release.

References

External links 
 
 
 
 

 
English electronic dance music record labels
Compilation album series
Record labels established in 1996